This is a list of sieges, land and naval battles of the War of the First Coalition (20 April 1792 – 18 October 1797). It includes the battles of:
 the Low Countries theatre, or Flanders campaign (1792–1795);
 the Rhine campaigns (Valmy campaign August–September 1792, Mainz/Frankfurt October 1792, Rhine campaign of 1793–94, Rhine campaign of 1795, Rhine campaign of 1796);
 the April 1792 incursions into Switzerland;
 the Italian campaigns (April 1792 – October 1797);
 the Mediterranean campaign of 1793–1796;
 the War of the Pyrenees (March 1793 – July 1795);
 overseas naval or colonial battles (insofar these were not part of the Haitian Revolution or East Indies theatre); and
 insurrections in Paris that overtook or threatened to overtake the central government. 

It does not include battles from the War in the Vendée (1793), nor the Chouannerie (1794–1800), nor the Haitian Revolution (1791–1804), nor the East Indies theatre of the French Revolutionary Wars (1793–1801), as these did not involve the First Coalition as such.

See also 
 List of battles of the War of the Second Coalition (1798/9 – 1801/2)
 List of battles of the War of the Third Coalition (1803/1805–1805/1806)
 List of battles of the War of the Fourth Coalition (9 October 1806 – 9 July 1807)
 List of battles of the War of the Fifth Coalition (10 April – 14 October 1809)
 List of battles of the War of the Sixth Coalition (3 March 1813 – 30 May 1814)
 List of battles of the Hundred Days (War of the Seventh Coalition) (15/20 March – 8 July / 16 August 1815)

References

Bibliography 
 
 

First Coalition